Richard I. Morimoto is a Japanese American molecular biologist. He is the Bill and Gayle Cook Professor of Biology and Director of the Rice Institute for Biomedical Research at Northwestern University.

Education and academic career
He holds a B.S. from the University of Illinois at Chicago, received a Ph.D. in biology (laboratory of Professor Murray Rabinowitz) from The University of Chicago in 1978, and conducted postdoctoral research (laboratory of Professor Matthew Meselson) and was a Tutor in Biochemical Sciences at Harvard University in Cambridge, MA. In 1982, Morimoto joined the faculty of the Department of Biochemistry, Molecular Biology, and Cell Biology at Northwestern University in Evanston, IL. He served previously as the Chair of Biochemistry, Molecular Biology, and Cell Biology, the Dean of The Graduate School, and the Associate Provost of Graduate Education at Northwestern University.

Civic leadership
Faculty liaison to founding of the Asian American Studies Program at [[Northwestern University]] – March, 1995
Faculty Advisory Board – Asian American Studies Program at Northwestern University – 1999-
Midwest Buddhist Temple, Chicago, IL. – Board of Trustees, 2004- ;  President, Board of Trustees, 2009 – 2014
Japanese American Citizens League, Japanese American of the Biennium, 2010
Chicago Nikkei Forum, 2014-
Board of Trustees, Japanese American National Museum, 2014-
Japanese American Leadership Delegation, 2015, U.S.-Japan Council (USJC), Foreign Ministry of Japan

Science
Morimoto is widely recognized for his research on the regulation of the heat shock stress response and the function of molecular chaperones. His current research is to understand how organisms sense and respond to physiologic and environmental stress through the activation of genetic pathways that integrate stress responses with molecular and cellular responses that determine cell growth and cell death. The stress of misfolded and damaged proteins influences neuronal function and lifespan at the level of the organism. Consequently, these studies provide a molecular basis to elucidate the underlying mechanisms of neurodegenerative diseases including Huntington's disease, Parkinson's disease, ALS, and Alzheimer's disease. His laboratory has published over 250 papers and three monographs including two books on the Heat Shock Response and Molecular Chaperones from Cold Spring Harbor Press. During that period he received two MERIT awards from the National Institutes of Health and has been supported by the grants from the National Institutes for General Medical Science, National Institutes of Aging, National Institutes for Neurological Diseases and Stroke, American Cancer Society, Huntington's Disease Society of America, the Hereditary Disease Foundation, and the ALS Association. In addition to giving frequent talks at universities and scientific symposia throughout the world, he has been a Visiting Professor at the Technion University in Israel, Osaka University, Kyoto University, Kyoto Sangyo University, University of Rome, Beijing University, Åbo Akademi University in Finland, and École Normale Supérieure in Paris.  He is a founder of Proteostasis Therapeutics, Inc. in Cambridge, MA, a biotech company that is discovering and developing novel small molecule therapeutics designed to control the body's protein homeostasis. These novel therapies are designed to treat multiple degenerative disorders such as Alzheimer's disease, Parkinson's disease, Huntington's disease, cancer, and type II diabetes.

Science recognition
American Cancer Society Faculty Research Award, 1987
Commandeur, Ordre des Palmes Académiques, Ministry of Education, France, 2013
Doctor of Philosophy, Honoris Causa – Abo Akademi University, Turku, Finland, 2008
Dreyfus Distinguished Young Faculty Award, 1982
Elected Fellow of the American Academy of Arts and Sciences, 2011
Elected Fellow of the American Association for the Advancement of Science, 1998
Feodor Lynen Medal, 2014
National Institutes of Health Merit Award - National Institute for General Medical Science (2000), National Institute on Aging (2011)
Huntington's Disease Society of America, Award for Excellence in Medicine, 2005
Japan Society for the Promotion of Science Fellow, 2015
University of Illinois, Alumni Achievement Award, 2011

Significant papers
Capano, L. S., C. Sato, E. Ficulle, A. Yu, K. Horie, N. R. Barthelemy, S. G. Fox, C. M. Karch, R. J. Bateman, H. Houlden, R. I. Morimoto, D. M. Holtzman, K. E. Duff, and A. S. Yoo.  Recapitulation of Endogenous 4R Tau Expression Analogous to the Adult Brain in Directly Reprogrammed Human Neurons. Cell Stem Cell. 29: 918-932, doi: 10.1016/j.stem.2022.04.018 (2022).
Morimoto, R.I., and G.S. Budinger. Protein Folding Disorders. In: Harrison’s Principles of Internal Medicine (eds. J. Loscalzo, A. Fauci, D.L. Kasper, S.L. Hauser, D.L. Longo, J.L. Jameson), 21, Ch. 491 (2022).
Sala, A.J. and R.I. Morimoto. Protecting the Future: Balancing Proteostasis for Reproduction. Trends in Cell Biology. 32(3): 202-215, doi.org/10.1016/j.tcb.2021.09.009 (2022).
Sinnige, T., G. Meisl, T. C. T. Michaels, M. Vendruscolo, T. P.J. Knowles, and R. I. Morimoto.  Kinetic Analysis Reveals that Independent Nucleation Events Determines the Progression of Protein Aggregation in C. elegans. Proc. Natl. Acad. Sci. U.S.A.  118(11): https://doi.org/10.1073/pnas.2021888118  (2021).
Sala, A.J., L.C.  Bott, R.M. Brielmann, and R.I. Morimoto. Embryo Integrity Regulates Maternal Proteostasis and Stress Resilience. Genes and Development.  34: 678-687,doi:10.1101/gad.335422.119, PMID 32217667 (2020).
Morimoto, R.I. Cell Non-Autonomous Regulation of Proteostasis in Aging and Disease. Cold Spring Harbor Perspectives in Biology  DOI: 10.1101/cshperspect.a034074 (2019). 
Morimoto, R.I. Cell Non-Autonomous Regulation of Proteostasis in Aging and Disease. Protein Homeostasis in Biology and Disease, eds. R.I. Morimoto, F. U. Hartl and J. W. Kelly, Cold Spring Harbor Press, 552p. (2019). 
Yu, A., S.G. Fox, A. Cavallini, C. Kerridge, M. J. O’Neill, J. Wolak, S. Bose, and R. I. Morimoto. Tau Protein Aggregates Inhibit the Protein-Folding and Vesicular Trafficking Arms of the Cellular Proteostasis Network. J. Biological Chemistry 294(19): 7917-7930 DOI:10.1074/jbc.RA119.007527 (2019).  
Stoeger, T., M. Gerlach, R.I. Morimoto, and L.N. Amaral. Large Scale Investigation of the Reasons why Potentially Important Genes are Ignored. PLoS Biology 16(9): e2006643 DOI.org/10/1371/journal.pbio.2006643 (2018).
Ciryam, P., I. Lambert-Smith, D. M. Bean,D. N. Saunders, M. R. Wilson, R. I. Morimoto, S. G. Oliver, C. M. Dobson, M. Vendruscolo, G. Favrin, and J. J. Yerbury. Tissue-specific Patterns of Supersaturation are Associated with Co-Aggregation in ALS Inclusion Bodies. Proc. Natl. Acad. Sci. USA. 114(20): E3935–E3943 DOI:10.1073/pnas.1613854114 (2017). 
Sala, A.J., L.C. Bott, and R.I. Morimoto. Shaping Proteostasis at the Cellular, Tissue, and Organismal Level. Journal of Cell Biology 216: DOI: 10.1083/jcb.201612111 (2017). 
Kundra, R., P. Ciryam, R. I. Morimoto, C. M. Dobson, and M. Vendruscolo. Protein Homeostasis of a Metastable Subproteome Associated with Alzheimer’s Disease. Proc. Natl. Acad. Sci. USA. 114(28): E5703-E5711 DOI: 10.1073/pnas.1618417114 (2017). 
Li, J., J. Labbadia, and R.I. Morimoto. Rethinking the Roles of HSF-1 in Cell Stress, Development and Organismal Health. Trends in Cell Biology 12: DOI: org/10.1016/ j.tcb.2017.08.002 (2017).  
Kirstein, J., K. Arnsburg, A. Scior, A. Szlachcic, D. Lys Guilbride, R.I. Morimoto, B. Bukau, and N.B. Nillegoda. In vivo Properties of the Disaggregase Function of J-domain Proteins and Hsc70 in C. elegans Stress and Aging.  Aging Cell 16: 1414-1424, DOI: 10.1111/acel.12686 (2017). 
Labbadia, J., R. Brielmann, M. Neto, Y.-F. Lin, C.M. Haynes, and R.I. Morimoto.  Mitochondrial Stress Restores the Heat Shock Response and Prevents Proteostasis Collapse During Aging. Cell Reports 21: 1481-1494, DOI.org/10.1016/ j.celrep.2017.10.038 (2017).
Ciryam, P., R. Kundra, R. Freer, R. I. Morimoto, C. M. Dobson, and M. Vendruscolo. A Transcriptional Signature of Alzheimer’s Disease is Associated with a Metastable Subproteome at Risk for Aggregation. Proc. Natl. Acad. Sci. U.S.A. 113 (17): 4753-4758 DOI: 10.1073 (2016). 
Li, J., L. Chauve, G. Phelps, R. Brielmann, and R.I. Morimoto. E2F Co-regulates an Essential HSF Developmental Program Distinct from the Heat Shock Response. Genes and Development 30: 2062-2075 PMID 27688402 (2016). 
Winter, P. B., R. M. Brielmann, N. P. Timkovich, H. T. Navarro, A. Teixeira-Castro, R. I. Morimoto, and L. A. N. Amaral.  A Network Approach to Discerning the Identities of Visually Indistinguishable Organisms in a Free Moving Population. Scientific Reports 6: DOI: 10.1038/srep34859 (2016).
 
 
 

 
 
 
 
 
 
 
 
 
 

 
 

 
 
 

 
 
 

Morley J.F., Brignull H.R., Weyers J.J. and R.I. Morimoto. "The threshold for polyglutamine-expansion protein aggregation and cellular toxicity is dynamic and influenced by aging in Caenorhabditis elegans. Proc Natl Acad Sci U S A. (2002). doi 10.1073/pnas.152161099

In pop culture
In a YouTube video published in 2009, members of the Morimoto lab showed  C. elegans  forming a smiley face  on a culture plate. The video description jokes that when a post doc in the lab told them to smile, the C. elegans, lacking faces as individuals, formed the smiley face as a group, suggesting that they are intelligent, have ears, and can work in groups. In reality, the footage is  playing in reverse: the C. elegans were placed into that formation on the plate by a human and then crawled away. By reversing the footage, it looks like the C. elegans spontaneously form a smiley face. The video manipulation is hinted at in the description that reminds the viewers that the YFP is brighter in the individuals' head than their tails.

References

External links
Morimoto Lab Website
Morimoto Research Summary

American molecular biologists
21st-century American biologists
University of Illinois Chicago alumni
University of Chicago alumni
Northwestern University faculty
Living people
Academic staff of Osaka University
People from Chicago
1952 births
Recipients of the Ordre des Palmes Académiques
Harvard University staff